Burry Holms, a tidal island with the height of  is at the northern end of Rhossili Bay in the Gower Peninsula, Wales. During spring and summer, Burry Holms is covered by flowers such as thrift and sea campion.

Etymologies
The island was well known within Celtic Christianity as it was heavily associated with traditions of Saint Cenydd (who is thought to have lived there as a hermit). As such, it would certainly have had an identifiable name in Old Welsh, possibly using Cenydd as an eponym. Later records of the name "Saint Kenyth atte Holmes" may also suggest a pre-Norse nomenclature associated with Cenydd. Despite this, the current English names only date back to the Norse period and the Modern Welsh name, Ynys Lanwol ("tidal island") is thought to be a relatively recent appellation.

"Holmes" is a common element of English place-names in Wales, ultimately deriving from the Old Norse holmr, which denotes "a small and rounded islet". The island appears as "Holmes" and "Holmes en Gower", in the Calendar of Patent rolls entries for the 1440s, where it is listed as a "chapel or hermitage". Variations on the Norse/English name continued into the modern era, with the island simply named as Holmes Island on early tithe maps (listed as a "Rectorial Glebe" of the parish of Llangennith). The modern English name, Burry Holms is another recent appellation with the word Burry likely referring to the island's archaeological remains.

History
9,000 years ago, the sea was up to 12 miles (19 km) away. Inhabited by nomadic Mesolithic hunters, flint tools provide the first evidence of their existence. Charcoal-charred hazelnut tools made out of wood and bone were found in 1919. A 1998 excavation by the National Museums and Galleries of Wales found that Burry Holms was used as a Mesolithic seasonal camp. Iron Age people subsequently built a  hillfort and ditch on the island, while in Medieval times it was home to a monastery. The island is popular among collectors of shells.

See also
List of hillforts in Wales

References

External links
 BBC history article 
 www.geograph.co.uk : photos of Burry Holms and surrounding area
 Artifacts from Burry Holms on Gathering the Jewels

Gower Peninsula
Hillforts in Swansea
Islands of Swansea
Prehistoric sites in Swansea
Tidal islands of Wales